The women's 100 metre freestyle competition of the swimming events at the 1995 Pan American Games took place between March 12–17 at the Complejo Natatorio. The last Pan American Games champion was Ashley Tappin of US.

This race consisted of two lengths of the pool, both lengths being in freestyle.

Results
All times are in minutes and seconds.

Heats

Final 
The final was held between March 12–17.

References

Swimming at the 1995 Pan American Games
1995 in women's swimming